The Big/Great Dipper is the American English term for the seven brightest stars of Ursa Major (The Plough in British English).

Big Dipper also may refer to:

Entertainment
 Big Dipper (Battersea Park), a wooden roller coaster operating in Battersea Park, London, England, from 1951 until 1972
 Big Dipper (Blackpool), a wooden roller coaster at Blackpool Pleasure Beach, England
 Big Dipper (Geauga Lake), a wooden roller coaster formerly at the now defunct Geauga Lake Park in Ohio, US
 Big Dipper (Luna Park Sydney), a wooden roller coaster operating at Luna Park Sydney, Australia from 1935 until 1981
 Big Dipper (Michigan's Adventure), a steel roller coaster in Michigan, US
 Cyclone (Dreamworld), a steel roller coaster which operated as Big Dipper at Luna Park Sydney, Australia from 1995 to 2001

Sport
 Wilt Chamberlain (1936–1999), American basketball player
 Robert DiPierdomenico (born 1958), Australian rules footballer
 Chris Duncan (born 1981), American baseball player

Music
 Big Dipper (band), a 1980s-1990s Boston alternative-rock band
 Big Dipper, professional name of American rapper Dan Stermer.
 Big Dipper (album), a 2003 album by Drop Trio
 The Great Dipper (album), a 2015 album by Roy Kim
 Big Dipper (Elton John song), a 1978 song by Elton John
 "Big Dipper", a song by Jethro Tull from their 1976 album Too Old to Rock 'n' Roll: Too Young to Die!
 "Big Dipper", a song by Built to Spill from their 1994 album There's Nothing Wrong with Love
 "Big Dipper", a song by Cracker from their 1996 album The Golden Age (Cracker album)
 "Big Dipper", a song by Death Grips from their 2014 album The Powers That B

Other uses
 Big Dipper Ice Arena, in Fairbanks, Alaska

See also
 Beidou (disambiguation), Chinese equivalent of the asterism
 Little Dipper (disambiguation)
 Starry Plough (disambiguation)